Migmathelphusa olivacea is a species of freshwater crab found in Lake Poso on the Indonesian island of Sulawesi. It is the only species in its genus. It is listed by the IUCN as Endangered, given "its extent of occurrence and area of occupancy is less than ", and its individuals being found in less than five locations. There is also a "decline in the extent and quality of its habitat and it is not found in a protected area". Being found around a lake, "present and future threats to this species include human-induced habitat loss/degradation due to population increases and industrial and agrarian development".

References

Further reading
Schubart, Christoph D., and Peter KL Ng. "A new molluscivore crab from Lake Poso confirms multiple colonization of ancient lakes in Sulawesi by freshwater crabs (Decapoda: Brachyura)." Zoological Journal of the Linnean Society 154.2 (2008): 211-221.
Poettinger, Theodor, and Christoph D. Schubart. "Molecular diversity of freshwater crabs from Sulawesi and the sequential colonization of ancient lakes." Hydrobiologia 739.1 (2014): 73-84.
von Rintelen, Thomas, et al. "Aquatic biodiversity hotspots in Wallacea: the species flocks in the ancient lakes of Sulawesi, Indonesia." Biotic evolution and environmental change in southeast Asia. Cambridge University Press, Cambridge (2012): 290-315.

External links

WORMS

Decapods
Freshwater crustaceans of Asia
Crustaceans of Indonesia
Monotypic crustacean genera
Crustaceans described in 2006